Milan Troonbeeckx (born 20 February 2002) is a Belgian professional footballer who plays as a defender for Thes Sport on loan from  Lommel.

Early life
He attended Heilig Hartcollege in Heist-op-den-Berg.

Career
After playing youth football for Westerlo and Lierse, he signed for Dessel Sport in 2018, before being promoted to their senior team a year later. After coming on as an 80th-minute substitute for Thomas Jutten against Rupel Boom on 23 November 2019 to make his senior debut, he scored Dessel's fourth goal of a 4–0 win in the 84th-minute after tapping in a Mike Smet cross. He scored once in six league games for Dessel in the 2019–20 season.

In July 2020, he signed for Lommel of the Belgian First Division B on a three-year contract.

On 24 August 2022, Troonbeeckx was loaned to Thes Sport for the 2022–23 season.

References

External links
 

2002 births
Living people
Belgian footballers
Association football defenders
K.F.C. Dessel Sport players
Lommel S.K. players
K.V.V. Thes Sport Tessenderlo players
Challenger Pro League players
Belgian National Division 1 players